The United States Senate Committee on Environment and Public Works is responsible for legislation and oversight of the natural and built environment and for studying matters concerning environmental protection and resource conservation and utilitization.

Jurisdiction
In accordance of Rule XXV of the United States Senate, all proposed legislation, messages, petitions, memorials, and other matters relating to the following subjects is referred to the Senate Committee on Environment and Public Works:
 Air pollution;
 Construction and maintenance of highways;
 Environmental aspects of Outer Continental Shelf lands;
 Environmental effects of toxic substances, other than pesticides;
 Environmental policy;
 Environmental research and development;
 Fisheries and wildlife;
 Flood control and improvements of rivers and harbors, including environmental aspects of deepwater ports;
 Noise pollution;
 Nonmilitary environmental regulation and control of nuclear energy;
 Ocean dumping;
 Public buildings and improved grounds of the United States generally, including Federal buildings in the District of Columbia;
 Public works, bridges, and dams;
 Regional economic development;
 Solid waste disposal and recycling;
 Water pollution; and,
 Water resources.
The Senate Committee on Environment and Public Works is also charged to "study and review, on a comprehensive basis, matters relating to environmental protection and resource utilization and conservation, and report thereon from time to time."

Members, 118th Congress

Chairmen

Chairmen of the Senate Committee on Public Buildings, 1838–1857
William S. Fulton (D-AR) 1838–1841
John Leeds Kerr (W-MD) 1841–1842
William L. Dayton (W-NJ) 1842–1845
Simon Cameron (D-PA) 1845–1846
Jesse D. Bright (D-IN) 1846–1847
Robert M. T. Hunter (D-VA) 1847–1851
James Whitcomb (D-IN) 1851–1852
Charles James (D-RI) 1852–1853
James Bayard (D-DE) 1853–1857

Chairmen of the Joint Committee on Public Buildings and Grounds, 1857–1883
Jesse D. Bright (D-IN) 1857–1861
Solomon Foot (R-VT) 1861–1866
B. Gratz Brown (R-MO) 1866–1867
William P. Fessenden (R-ME) 1867–1869
Justin S. Morrill (R-VT) 1869–1878
Henry Dawes (R-MA) 1878–1879
Charles W. Jones (D-FL) 1879–1881
Edward H. Rollins (R-NH) 1881–1883

Chairmen of the Senate Committee on Public Buildings and Grounds, 1883–1947
William Mahone (R-VA) 1883–1887
Leland Stanford (R-CA) 1887–1893
George Vest (D-MO) 1893–1895
Matthew S. Quay (R-PA) 1895–1899
Charles W. Fairbanks (R-IN) 1899–1905
Francis E. Warren (R-WY) 1905
Nathan B. Scott (R-WV) 1905–1911
George Sutherland (R-UT) 1911–1913
Claude A. Swanson (D-VA) 1913–1918
James A. Reed (D-MO) 1918–1919
Bert M. Fernald (R-ME) 1919–1926
Irvine L. Lenroot (R-WI) 1926–1927
Henry W. Keyes (R-NH) 1927–1933
Tom Connally (D-TX) 1933–1942
Francis Maloney (D-CT) 1942–1945
Charles O. Andrews (D-FL) 1945–1947

Chairmen of the Senate Committee on Public Works, 1947–1977
Chapman Revercomb (R-WV) 1947–1949
Dennis Chavez (D-NM) 1949–1953
Edward Martin (R-PA) 1953–1955
Dennis Chavez (D-NM) 1955–1962
Patrick V. McNamara (D-MI) 1962–1966
Jennings Randolph (D-WV) 1966–1977

Chairmen of the Senate Committee on Environment and Public Works, 1977–present
Jennings Randolph (D-WV) 1977–1981
Robert T. Stafford (R-VT) 1981–1987
Quentin N. Burdick (D-ND) 1987–1992
Daniel Patrick Moynihan (D-NY) 1992–1993
Max Baucus (D-MT) 1993–1995
John H. Chafee (R-RI) 1995–1999
Bob Smith (R-NH) 1999–2001
Harry Reid (D-NV) 2001
Bob Smith (R-NH) 2001
James Jeffords (I-VT) 2001–2003
James Inhofe (R-OK) 2003–2007
Barbara Boxer (D-CA) 2007–2015
James Inhofe (R-OK) 2015-2017
John Barrasso (R-WY) 2017–2021
Tom Carper (D-DE) 2021–present

Historical committee rosters

117th Congress

Subcommittees

116th Congress

Subcommittees

115th Congress

114th Congress

Source:

References

External links
U.S. Senate Committee on Environment and Public Works official website (Archive)
Senate Environment and Public Works Committee. Legislation activity and reports, Congress.gov.
 Public Works Agency – Public Works Industry Social Network including Municipal Contractors, Municipalities and Citizen Engagement

Environment and Public Works
Environment of the United States
1838 establishments in the United States